Anthony Ian Young, Baron Young of Norwood Green  (born 14 April 1942) is a British politician and Labour Party life peer in the House of Lords.

Professional career
He had previously been General Secretary of the National Communications Union (1989–1995), then joint General Secretary (1995–1998), then Senior Deputy General Secretary (1998–2002) of the Communication Workers Union.  He also served as a Governor of the BBC.

Parliamentary career
In the 2002 Birthday Honours Young was awarded a knighthood, having the honour conferred by The Prince of Wales on 13 December 2002. He was created a life peer on 25 June 2004 taking the title Baron Young of Norwood Green, of Norwood Green in the London Borough of Ealing.

In October 2008 he was appointed as Parliamentary Under-Secretary of State for Skills and Apprenticeships in the Department for Innovation, Universities and Skills, being moved to the Department for Business, Innovation and Skills when it was created in the June 2009 reshuffle, continuing as a Parliamentary Under Secretary of State, but with responsibility for Employment Relations and Postal Affairs until 11 May 2010.

In June 2021, Young was appointed as a trustee of the LGB Alliance.

In March 2022, he was reprimanded in the House of Lords after falling asleep during a debate on genetically modified organisms.

References

1942 births
Living people
Young of Norwood Green, Anthony Young, Baron
General Secretaries of the Communication Workers Union (UK)
BBC Governors
Members of the General Council of the Trades Union Congress
People educated at Harrow High School
Presidents of the Trades Union Congress
Knights Bachelor
Life peers created by Elizabeth II